The Hunter River (Wonnarua: Coquun) is a major river in New South Wales, Australia. The Hunter River rises in the Liverpool Range and flows generally south and then east, reaching the Tasman Sea at Newcastle, the second largest city in New South Wales and a major harbour port. Its lower reaches form an open and trained mature wave dominated barrier estuary.

Course and features
The Hunter River rises on the western slopes of Mount Royal Range, part of the Liverpool Range, within Barrington Tops National Park, east of Murrurundi, and flows generally northwest and then southwest before being impounded by Lake Glenbawn; then flowing southwest and then east southeast before reaching its mouth of the Tasman Sea, in Newcastle between Nobbys Head and Stockton. The river is joined by ten tributaries upstream of Lake Glenbawn; and a further thirty-one tributaries downstream of the reservoir. The main tributaries are the Pages, Goulburn, Williams and the Paterson rivers and the Moonan, Stewarts and Wollombi brooks. East of Hexham, the river splits into two main channels, separated by the Ramsar-protected Kooragang Wetlands that feeds Milham Ponds, Wader Pond, Swan Pond and a series of smaller wetland pondages. The southern arm of the river also creates Hexham Island, while the northern creates Smiths Island and flows in Fullerton Cove. The two channels converge at Walsh Point, reaching confluence with Throsby Creek adjacent to the Newcastle central business district, before reaching the river mouth. The Hunter River descends  over its  course from the high upper reaches, through the Hunter Valley, and out to sea.

The Hunter River is subject to substantial flooding, which Glenbawn Dam, near Scone, was constructed to ameliorate. Major floods have occurred on the Hunter including the flood of 1955 that caused devastation to townships along the river, especially Maitland. Severe flooding again occurred in June 2007 and again in 2015.

Towns along the Hunter River, from upstream to downstream, include Aberdeen, Muswellbrook, Denman, Jerrys Plains, Singleton, Maitland, Morpeth, and Raymond Terrace.

At Hexham, the river is transversed by the Pacific Highway; while at Singleton and again at Aberdeen, the river is crossed by the New England Highway; and the Golden Highway crosses the river to the north and to the southeast of Denman.

Hunter Valley
The Hunter Valley is one of the best routes to the interior of the state with access relatively unimpeded by mountains and other obstacles. It is the largest area of relatively low-lying land near the coast of New South Wales, and owing to the shielding by rugged ranges to its north, is much drier than any other coastal region of the state.

Except for the driest parts of Tasmania and a small area of the Monaro between Cooma and Nimmitabel, the Hunter Valley is the southern limit of rich "black earths" (actually black cracking clays). These are the only soils in all of Australia with reasonable levels of soluble phosphorus, with the result that upstream from Singleton very rich pasture land with many thoroughbred horse studs occurs. Around Merriwa and south of Singleton, the soils are very infertile sands more typical of Australia as a whole, and the dominant land use is extensive grazing.

Parts of the Hunter Valley are important for grape growing and wine producing. The Hunter Valley is also one of Australia's most important coal mining areas. The Hunter River is threatened by drought, climate change and proposed loss of water due to coal mining. The region is also favoured by thoroughbred horse breeders and stud farms.

History
The Hunter River has been inhabited for thousands of years by the Wonnarua Aboriginal people, who called it the Coquun, meaning "fresh water". The Lower Hunter River nearer to the coast is the traditional country of the Awabakal people. Both groups spoke a similar language.

The river was first settled by European explorers in the 1790s. In June 1796 fishermen sheltering from bad weather discovered coal there, and the river was initially called Coal River. In 1797 it was formally named the Hunter, after Captain John Hunter who was Governor of the British colony in New South Wales at that time.

Gallery

See also

 Dundee, a shipwreck off the mouth of the Hunter River, 1808
 Environment of Australia
 Floods in Australia
 Hunter Valley cannabis infestation
 List of rivers in New South Wales (A-K)
 List of rivers of Australia
 Newcastle Port Corporation
 Rivers of New South Wales

References

External links

 
 
 

Dungog Shire
Maitland, New South Wales
Muswellbrook Shire
Geography of Newcastle, New South Wales
Port Stephens Council
 
Singleton Council
Upper Hunter Shire